Livio Stuffer (born 4 August 1935) is an Italian cross-country skier. He competed at the 1960 Winter Olympics, the 1964 Winter Olympics and the 1968 Winter Olympics.

References

External links
 

1935 births
Living people
Italian male cross-country skiers
Olympic cross-country skiers of Italy
Cross-country skiers at the 1960 Winter Olympics
Cross-country skiers at the 1964 Winter Olympics
Cross-country skiers at the 1968 Winter Olympics
People from Urtijëi
Sportspeople from Südtirol